The Securities Investor Protection Corporation (SIPC ) is a federally mandated, non-profit, member-funded, United States government corporation created under the Securities Investor Protection Act (SIPA) of 1970 that mandates membership of most US-registered broker-dealers. Although created by federal legislation and overseen by the Securities and Exchange Commission, the SIPC is neither a government agency nor a regulator of broker-dealers. The purpose of the SIPC is to expedite the recovery and return of missing customer cash and assets during the liquidation of a failed investment firm.

History

Enactment 
In response to the near collapse of the financial markets in 1970, Congress chose to enact legislation that could prevent an escalation of brokerage firm insolvencies and help stabilize the financial markets. In December 1970, Senator Edmund Muskie pushed forward a bill to create a Federal Broker Dealer Insurance Corporation. A compromise with the House resulted in the SIPA, which President Richard Nixon signed into law at the end of the month. Excerpts from the President's statement made clear the goals of the legislation:

The Paperwork Crunch and financial crisis 
The SIPC was born in the shadow of the "Paperwork Crunch" of 1968-70 as a means to restore confidence in the U.S. securities market. During this period,

An explosion in the volume of trading had occurred. A system designed to handle an average three million share trading day was incapable of dealing with the thirteen million share trading day common in the late 1960s. The resultant breakdown in the securities processing mechanism caused chaos as the number of errors in recording transactions multiplied. ... In December 1968, member firms of the New York Stock Exchange had $4.4 billion in "fails to deliver" and $4.7 billion in "fails to receive." Brokers and dealers were finding it difficult, if not impossible, to ascertain their own financial condition. ... This operational and financial crisis forced more than one hundred brokerage firms into liquidation causing thousands of customers to be seriously disadvantaged.

In response, the Securities Investor Protection Act of 1970 was enacted as a way to quell investor insecurity and save the securities market from a financial crisis. In his introduction of the Securities Investor Protection Act to the floor of the Senate, Senator Edmund Muskie stated:

The economic function of the securities markets is to channel individual institutional savings to private industry and thereby contribute to the growth of capital investment. Without strong capital markets it would be difficult for our national economy to sustain continued growth. ... Securities brokers support the proper functioning of these markets by maintaining a constant flow of debt and equity instruments. The continued financial wellbeing of the economy thus depends, in part, on public willingness to entrust assets to the securities industry.

Functions 
The SIPC serves two primary roles in the event that a broker-dealer fails.  First, the SIPC acts to organize the distribution of customer cash and securities to investors.  Second, to the extent a customer's cash and/or securities are unavailable, the SIPC can pay the customer (via its trustee) up to $500,000 for missing equity, including up to $250,000 for missing cash. In most cases where a brokerage firm has failed or is on the brink of failure, SIPC first seeks to transfer customer accounts to another brokerage firm. Should that process fail, the insolvent firm will be liquidated. In order to state a claim, the investor is required to show that their economic loss arose because of the insolvency of their broker-dealer and not because of fraud, misrepresentation, or bad investment decisions. In certain circumstances, securities or cash may not exist in full based upon a customer's statement. In this case, protection is also extended to investors whose "securities may have been lost, improperly hypothecated, misappropriated, never purchased, or even stolen".

While customers' cash and most types of securities - such as notes, stocks, bonds and certificates of deposit - are protected, other items such as commodity or futures contracts are not covered.  Investment contracts, certificates of interest, participations in profit-sharing agreements, and oil, gas, or mineral royalties or leases are not covered unless registered with the Securities and Exchange Commission.

Organization 
SIPC is led by seven directors, five appointed by the President of the United States with the advice and consent of the United States Senate, one by the United States Department of the Treasury, and one by the Federal Reserve. Directors serve terms of 3 years. In 2017, the total compensation and benefits of its 39 employees was $11 million.

Caveats and clarifications 
Although modeled loosely on the Federal Deposit Insurance Corporation (FDIC) which protects bank customers, the SIPC has wider discretion in satisfying customer claims. When securities are missing, it can arrange to provide either replacement securities of the same kind, or their cash value on the date that its trustee was appointed to the case. The SIPC does not protect investors against any loss in the value of their securities, nor does it assume responsibility for any promises about investment performance. Unregistered securities and commodity contracts are not covered by the SIPC, even when brokered by a member firm. Account disputes with a brokerage that remains in business are not handled by the SIPC, but typically by the Financial Industry Regulatory Authority (FINRA) and the Commodity Futures Trading Commission (CFTC).

The limitations of SIPC protection caused significant confusion among a number of investors following the collapse of Bear Stearns and Lehman Brothers and perhaps, most prominently, following the exposure of Bernard Madoff's and Allen Stanford's and the Stanford Financial Group's ponzi scheme frauds.

In the Madoff fraud, where securities had allegedly not actually been purchased, SIPC and the SIPC Trustee challenged and disposed of the claims of approximately one-half of customers of the Madoff firm, arguing that over the course of time those investors had withdrawn more funds than had been invested, resulting in a negative "net equity", and, therefore, not eligible for SIPC protection.

Inasmuch as SIPC does not insure the underlying value of the financial asset it protects, investors bear the risk of the market. In addition, investors also bear any losses of account value that exceed the current amount of SIPC protection, namely $500,000 for securities. For example, if an investor buys 100 shares of XYZ company from a brokerage firm and the firm declares bankruptcy or merges with another, the 100 shares of XYZ still belong to the investor and should be recoverable.  However, if the value of XYZ declines, SIPC does not insure the difference.  In other words, the $500,000 limit is to protect against broker malfeasance, not poor investment decisions and changes in the market value of securities.  In addition, SIPC may protect investors against unauthorized trades in their account, while the failure to execute a trade is not covered. Again, this only pertains to an insolvent broker or dealer.

Under rules of the regulatory SRO governing brokers and dealers—the Financial Industry Regulatory Authority (FINRA), the investors' and the brokerage firms' assets must be segregated; they may not be commingled.  It could be a civil or criminal violation if an investor's assets were inappropriately commingled.  If the firm files for bankruptcy, provided the assets have been appropriately segregated, the investor's assets should be recoverable, beyond SIPC's current protection limit of $500,000, of the net equity, per account and $250,000 for cash claims.   However, as noted above, not all asset types are covered by SIPC, such as annuities.

See also 
 Financial Industry Regulatory Authority (FINRA)
 Municipal Securities Rulemaking Board (MSRB)
 Portfolio insurance
 Recovery of funds from the Madoff investment scandal
 Canadian Investor Protection Fund (Canadian counterpart)

References

Further reading
 
 
 Letter to Gene L. Dodaro Comptroller General of the United States Government Accountability Office from Congress requesting probe
 Miscellaneous Congressional testimony and other information regarding Madoff

External links
 
 Resources relative to Madoff fraud:
 Network for Investor Action and Protection (NIAP)
  
  
 

Financial regulatory authorities of the United States
Self-regulatory organizations in the United States
Corporations chartered by the United States Congress
Government-owned companies of the United States
United States securities law
Investment in the United States
501(c)(6) nonprofit organizations